Nezarini is a tribe of stink bugs in the family Pentatomidae.

Genera

There are at least 21 described genera in the Nezarini including:
 Acrosternum Fieber, 1860
 Acrozangis Breddin, 1900
 Aesula Stål, 1876
 Aethemenes Stål, 1876
 Alciphron (insect) Stål, 1876
 Amblybelus Montrouzier, 1864
 Brachynema Mulsant et Rey, 1852
 Cellobius Jakovlev, 1885
 Chalazonotum Ribes et Schmitz, 1992
 Chinavia Orian, 1965
 Chlorochroa Stål, 1872
 Chroantha Stål, 1872
 Glaucias Kirkaldy, 1908
 Kurumana Linnavuori, 1972
 Neoacrosternum Day, 1965
 Nezara Amyot et Serville, 1843
 Palomena Mulsant et Rey, 1866
 Parachinavia Roche, 1977
 Pseudoacrosternum Day, 1965
 Roferta Rolston, 1981

References

Further reading

External links

 
Pentatominae
Hemiptera tribes